Sultan Sri Alam, also known as Sultan Mughal (d. 1579) was the sixth sultan of Aceh in northern Sumatra. He led a very brief reign in the year 1579 before being deposed and killed.

Sultan Mughal was one of the five sons of Sultan Alauddin al-Kahar. Before his accession he governed Priaman, a port town on the west coast of Sumatra. He was married to Raja Dewi, a daughter of Munawwar Syah of the Indrapura kingdom. When his elder brother Ali Ri'ayat Syah I died in 1579, he was briefly succeeded by his infant son Sultan Muda. The latter soon died, and the throne went to Sultan Mughal who took the reign name Sultan Sri Alam. According to the chronicle Hikayat Aceh he was excessively generous. Especially he gave away riches to the uleëbalangs (chiefs) of Barus, yet a port town on the west coast. Since the treasury was emptied, two grandees of the kingdom called Maharaja and Malik az-Zahir found him unsuited and deposed him after a very brief reign. The chronicle Bustanus Salatin relates that he was bad-tempered and unfit to rule, and was therefore deprived of his throne as well as his life. He was succeeded by his nephew Zainul Abidin. He was the progenitor of the later sultans of Indrapura. According to a much later genealogy he had a son Syekh Muhyuddin Fadlil Syah, whose great-granddaughter ruled Aceh as Kamalat Syah (1688-1699).

References

Literature

 Djajadiningrat, Raden Hoesein (1911) 'Critisch overzicht van de in Maleische werken vervatte gegevens over de geschiedenis van het soeltanaat van Atjeh', Bijdragen tot de Taal-, Land- en Volkenkunde, 65, pp. 135–265.
 Hasjmy, A (1977) 59 tahun Aceh merdeka dibawah pemerintahan ratu (Jakarta: Bulan Bintang).
 Iskandar, Teuku (1958) De Hikajat Atjeh ('s Gravenhage: M. Nijhoff).
 Kathirithamby-Wells, Jeyamalar (1976) 'The Inderapura Sultanate: The Foundations of Its Rise and Decline, From the Sixteenth to Eighteenth Centuries', Indonesia 21.

1579 deaths
Sultans of Aceh
Year of birth missing
16th-century Indonesian people